The 2013 Men's Hockey Junior World Cup was the 10th edition of the Hockey Junior World Cup for men, an international field hockey tournament. It was held between 6–15 December 2013 in New Delhi, India.

Germany won the tournament for the sixth time after defeating France 5–2 in the final, who participated in their first ever final in a top international event. The Netherlands won the third place match by defeating Malaysia 7–2.

Qualification
Each continental federation got a number of quotas depending on the FIH World Rankings for teams qualified through their junior continental championships. Alongside the host nation, 16 teams will compete in the tournament.

First round
All times are Indian Standard Time (UTC+05:30)

Pool A

Pool B

Pool C

Pool D

Classification round

Thirteenth to sixteenth place classification

Crossover

Fifteenth and sixteenth place

Thirteenth and fourteenth place

Ninth to twelfth place classification

Cross-overs

Eleventh and twelfth place

Ninth and tenth place

Medal round

Bracket

Quarter-finals

Fifth to eighth place classification

Cross-overs

Seventh and eighth place

Fifth and sixth place

First to fourth place classification

Semi-finals

Third and fourth place

Final

Awards

Statistics

Final standings

Goalscorers

See also
 2013 Women's Hockey Junior World Cup

References

External links
Official website

Junior World Cup
International field hockey competitions hosted by India
Hockey Junior World Cup
Hockey Junior World Cup
Hockey World Cup
Sport in New Delhi
Men's Hockey